Qingzhen Township (Mandarin: 青珍乡) is a township in Gadê County, Golog Tibetan Autonomous Prefecture, Qinghai, China. In 2010, Qingzhen Township had a total population of 5,704: 2,928 males and 2,776 females: 1,863 aged under 14, 3,592 aged between 15 and 65 and 249 aged over 65.

References 

Township-level divisions of Qinghai
Golog Tibetan Autonomous Prefecture